"The Load Of Sugar-Cane" is a poem from Wallace Stevens's first book of poetry, Harmonium.

In her review of Harmonium Marianne Moore picks out "The Load of Sugar-Cane" for praise because it achieves its splendor cumulatively. It illustrates an element of his craft, his "refraining for fear of impairing [a poem's] litheness of contour, from overelaborating felicities inherent in a subject." The red turban of the boatman in the final stanza is a little surprise, not what one would expect in the evidently Floridian everglades. Stevens is upsetting easy traditional expectations in this little experiment.

Notes

References 

Moore, Marianne. "Well moused, Lion." The Dial 76 (1924). Reprinted in Twentieth Century Literature 30 (1984).

1921 poems
American poems
Poetry by Wallace Stevens